Mitogen-activated protein kinase 7 also known as MAP kinase 7 is an enzyme that in humans is encoded by the MAPK7 gene.

Function 

MAPK7 is a member of the MAP kinase family. MAP kinases act as an integration point for multiple biochemical signals, and are involved in a wide variety of cellular processes such as proliferation, differentiation, transcription regulation and development. This kinase is specifically activated by mitogen-activated protein kinase kinase 5 (MAP2K5/MEK5). It is involved in the downstream signaling processes of various receptor molecules including receptor tyrosine kinases, and G protein-coupled receptors. In response to extracellular signals, this kinase translocates to the cell nucleus, where it regulates gene expression by phosphorylating, and activating different transcription factors. Four alternatively spliced transcript variants of this gene encoding two distinct isoforms have been reported.

MAPK7 is also critical for cardiovascular development  and is essential for endothelial cell function.

Interactions 

MAPK7 has been shown to interact with:

 C-Raf, 
 Gap junction protein, alpha 1 
 MAP2K5,
 MEF2C, 
 MEF2D, 
 PTPRR, 
 SGK,  and
 YWHAB.

References

Further reading

External links 
 MAP Kinase Resource  .

EC 2.7.11